The men's shot put event at the 2014 World Junior Championships in Athletics was held in Eugene, Oregon, USA, at Hayward Field on 24 July.  A 6 kg (junior implement) shot was used.

Medalists

Results

Final
24 July
Start time: 18:04  Temperature: 23 °C  Humidity: 47 %
End time: 19:03  Temperature: 22 °C  Humidity: 46 %

Qualifications
24 July
With qualifying standard of 19.25 (Q) or at least the 12 best performers (q) advance to the Final

Summary

Details
With qualifying standard of 19.25 (Q) or at least the 12 best performers (q) advance to the Final

Group A
24 July
Start time; 10:15  Temperature: 16 °C  Humidity: 68 %
End time: 10:47  Temperature: 16 °C  Humidity: 68 %

Group B
24 July
Start time; 10:15  Temperature: 16 °C  Humidity: 68 %
End time: 10:53  Temperature: 16 °C  Humidity: 68 %

Participation
According to an unofficial count, 26 athletes from 17 countries participated in the event.

References

Shot put
Shot put at the World Athletics U20 Championships